The race last run as Drive for the Cure 250 presented by Blue Cross Blue Shield of North Carolina is a NASCAR Xfinity Series stock car race that takes place at Charlotte Motor Speedway in Concord, North Carolina.

It is held before the NASCAR Cup Series' Bank of America Roval 400 in the playoffs.

In 2018, the race was shifted to run the "Roval" infield road course configuration of Charlotte. With this, the race length was shortened from 300 miles to 200 kilometers (125 miles). It would also move up a week on the Xfinity Series schedule, the middle race of the first round of the playoffs. Chase Briscoe became the first Xfinity Series driver to win the race in its Roval configuration. The race was increased to 67 laps and 250 km (155.34 mi) in 2019.

Past winners

1976: Race postponed from October 9 due to rain.
1977: Race shortened due to rain.
2003: Race postponed from Friday to Saturday due to rain.
2006, 2020, 2021 & 2022: Races extended due to NASCAR overtime.
2016: Race postponed from Friday to Sunday afternoon due to rain.

Multiple winners (drivers)

Multiple winners (teams)

Manufacturer wins

References

External links
 
 

1982 establishments in North Carolina
NASCAR Xfinity Series races
 
Recurring sporting events established in 1982
Annual sporting events in the United States